Peterson and Mustard's Hermitage Farm is a historic home located near Smyrna, Kent County, Delaware.  It built about 1863, and is a two-story, "L"-shaped frame dwelling in the Italianate "peach house" style. It consists of a three bay, flat roofed main block with a rear service wing. The front facade features a Greek Revival-style entryway.  Also on the property are a contributing granary-loading shed group and stable; both of pegged braced-frame construction, and probably dating from the 19th century.

It was listed on the National Register of Historic Places in 1982.

References

Houses on the National Register of Historic Places in Delaware
Greek Revival houses in Delaware
Italianate architecture in Delaware
Houses completed in 1863
Houses in Kent County, Delaware
National Register of Historic Places in Kent County, Delaware